Hirotaka Tamura is an electrical engineer at Fujitsu Laboratories Ltd. in Kawasaki, Japan. He was named a Fellow of the Institute of Electrical and Electronics Engineers (IEEE) in 2013 for his contributions to technology for high speed interconnects.

References

Fellow Members of the IEEE
Living people
Japanese electrical engineers
Year of birth missing (living people)
Place of birth missing (living people)